is a Japanese racewalker. She competed in the women's 10 kilometres walk at the 1996 Summer Olympics.

References

1972 births
Living people
Place of birth missing (living people)
Japanese female racewalkers
Olympic female racewalkers
Olympic athletes of Japan
Athletes (track and field) at the 1996 Summer Olympics
Asian Games competitors for Japan
Athletes (track and field) at the 1998 Asian Games
World Athletics Championships athletes for Japan
Japan Championships in Athletics winners